Kingston House, also known as the Johnston House, is a historic inn and tavern in Unity Township, Westmoreland County, Pennsylvania.  It was built about 1815, and is a 2 1/2-story, rubble stone building, five bays wide.  It has a center hall plan in the Federal style.  Attached to the house is a 1 1/2-story, masonry wing built in 1830.  It was built by Alexander Johnston, who was innkeeper and host to guests including presidential candidates William Henry Harrison and Zachary Taylor. His third son William F. Johnston (1808-1872) served as Governor of Pennsylvania from 1848 to 1851.

It was added to the National Register of Historic Places in 1983.

References

Hotel buildings on the National Register of Historic Places in Pennsylvania
Federal architecture in Pennsylvania
Houses completed in 1830
Buildings and structures in Westmoreland County, Pennsylvania
1830 establishments in Pennsylvania
National Register of Historic Places in Westmoreland County, Pennsylvania
Central-passage houses